"A Rose in the Wind" is the second single from Anggun's international debut album, Snow on the Sahara in 1998. There's also a French version of the song, "La rose des vents", released in the album Au Nom de la Lune in 1997 and an Indonesian version, "Kembali", released in the album Anggun for Indonesia and Malaysia market.  Commercially, the song reached Top 20 in several countries in Europe and Asia but couldn't repeat the success of 
Snow On the Sahara.

Track listing
 "A Rose in the Wind"
 "Kembali"
 "La rose des vents"

Song 
The song opens with an exotic-sounding flute, subdued verses and a soaring chorus. It features a rock edge, which pays quite a homage to the singer's past as a pop-rock singer in Indonesia. Moreover, there are some Indonesian spoken parts. Among the songs of the album Snow on the Sahara, Anggun acknowledges "A Rose in the Wind" as her favourite, affirming that: "It's my real story. It's the most personal song in terms of melody and a perfect example of what you find between Indonesia and the culture here (West). Lyrically, it's something in which you can find the different faces of me, of a woman, the weak, the strong, the things that frighten me, my dreams. This is so personal".

The song was well received by music critics internationally. "A Rose in the Wind" was selected as the second best single of 1998 by Billboard magazine editors, only behind Celine Dion's "My Heart Will Go On" and it was also used as one of NBA theme songs in the United States.

Charts

References
 Anggun's Singles Discography

1998 singles
Anggun songs
Songs written by Erick Benzi
Song recordings produced by Erick Benzi
Columbia Records singles
1997 songs
Songs written by Anggun